Sebastian Foss-Solevåg (born 13 July 1991) is a Norwegian World Cup alpine ski racer and specializes in slalom.

Career
Born in Ålesund, he competed at the 2014 Winter Olympics in Sochi, in slalom where he placed ninth.

Foss-Solevåg's first World Cup podium came in January 2015 at Zagreb, Croatia, and his first win came six years later at Flachau, Austria. He won the gold medal in the slalom at the World Championships in 2021 and won another in the team event.

World Cup results

Season standings

Race podiums
 2 wins – (2 SL)
 5 podiums – (5 SL)

World Championship results

Olympic results

References

External links
 
 
 

1991 births
Living people
Sportspeople from Ålesund
Alpine skiers at the 2014 Winter Olympics
Alpine skiers at the 2018 Winter Olympics
Alpine skiers at the 2022 Winter Olympics
Norwegian male alpine skiers
Olympic alpine skiers of Norway
Medalists at the 2018 Winter Olympics
Medalists at the 2022 Winter Olympics
Olympic medalists in alpine skiing
Olympic bronze medalists for Norway